Yeakel is a surname. Notable people with the surname include:

Earl Leroy Yeakel III (born 1945), American judge
Lynn Yeakel (1942–2022), American administrator and politician

English-language surnames